Liu Cheng-tao (born 2 October 1937) is a former Taiwanese cyclist. He competed in the individual road race and the team time trial events at the 1968 Summer Olympics.

References

External links
 

1937 births
Living people
Taiwanese male cyclists
Olympic cyclists of Taiwan
Cyclists at the 1968 Summer Olympics
People from Yunlin County
Asian Games medalists in cycling
Cyclists at the 1966 Asian Games
Medalists at the 1966 Asian Games
Asian Games silver medalists for Chinese Taipei